Thomas Hasilden (c. 1322 – c. 1387), of Wakefield, Yorkshire and Steeple Morden and Guilden Morden, Cambridgeshire, was an English politician.

He was a Member (MP) of the Parliament of England for Cambridgeshire in November 1384 and 1386.

References

1322 births
1387 deaths
English MPs November 1384
English MPs 1386
Politicians from Wakefield
People from South Cambridgeshire District